

Venues

Squads
Source:

France
Jean-Paul Baile (Carcassonne)
Jean-Marc Bourrel (Carcassonne)
Delphin Castanon (Lézignan)
Max Chantal (Villeneuve-sur-Lot)
Henri Daniel (Pia)
José Giné (Roanne)
Jean-Marc Gonzalès (Limoux)
Ivan Grésèque (XIII Catalan)
Jacques Guigue (Avignon)
Didier Hermet (Villeneuve-sur-Lot)
Christian Laumond (Villfranche)
Christian Macalli (Villeneuve-sur-Lot)
André Malacamp (Carcassonne)
Michel Mazaré (Villeneuve-sur-Lot)
Michel Naudo (Pia)
Marcel Pillon (Saint-Estève)
Sébastien Rodriguez (Toulouse)
Joël Roosebrouck (Villeneuve-sur-Lot) (Captain) 
Francis Tranier (Villefranche)
Charles Zalduendo (Toulouse)

England
Len Casey
Des Drummond
Steve Evans
George Fairbairn (Captain)
Peter Gorley
Jeff Grayshon
Neil Holding
Roy Holdstock
John Joyner
Harry Pinner
Keith Rayne
Alan Redfearn
Peter Smith
Mike Smith
David Ward
John Woods
Stuart Wright

Wales
John Bevan (Captain)
Harold Box
Chris Camilleri
Steve Diamond
Colin Dixon
Clive Griffiths
Mel James
Brian Juliff
Roy Mathias
Mark McJennett
Donald Parry
Paul Prendiville
Chris Seldon
Glyn Shaw
Trevor Skerrett
Graham Walters
Paul Woods

Results

Final standings

References

European Nations Cup
European rugby league championship
International rugby league competitions hosted by the United Kingdom
International rugby league competitions hosted by France
1980 in English rugby league
1980 in French rugby league
1980 in Welsh rugby league